Powell may refer to:

People
 Powell (surname)
 Powell (given name)
 Powell baronets, several baronetcies
Colonel Powell (disambiguation), several military officers
General Powell (disambiguation), several military leaders
Governor Powell (disambiguation), several governors
Justice Powell (disambiguation), several judges
Major Powell (disambiguation), several military officers
Secretary Powell (disambiguation), several officials
Senator Powell (disambiguation), several senators

Places
 Powell Butte (disambiguation), several hills
 Powell County (disambiguation), several counties
 Powell Creek (disambiguation), several watercourses
 Mount Powell (disambiguation) or Powell Mountain, several mountains
 Powell River (disambiguation), several watercourses
 Powell Township (disambiguation), several townships

Antarctica
 Powell Island, South Orkney Islands

Maldives
 Powell Islands, Raa Atoll, Maldives

United States
 Powell, Alabama, a town in DeKalb County
 Powell, Missouri, an unincorporated community in McDonald County
 Powell, Cass County, Missouri, a ghost town
 Powell, Nebraska, an unincorporated community
 Powell, Ohio, a city in Delaware County
 Powell, Edmunds County, South Dakota, an unincorporated community
 Powell, Haakon County, South Dakota, a ghost town
 Powell, Tennessee, an unincorporated community in Knox County 
 Powell, Texas, a town in Navarro County
 Powell, Wisconsin, an unincorporated community
 Powell, Wyoming, a city in Park County
 Lake Powell, a man-made reservoir on the Colorado River

Solar System
 Powell (crater), a crater in Taurus–Littrow valley on the Moon

Facilities and structures
 Powell Hall, home of the Saint Louis Symphony Orchestra in St. Louis, Missouri
 Powell Observatory, Louisburg, Kansas
 Powell Gardens, Kansas City, Missouri
 Powell House (disambiguation), several buildings
 Powell High School (disambiguation), several schools
 Powell Middle School (disambiguation), several schools

Companies
 Powell's Books, a chain of bookstores in the U.S. state of Oregon 
 Powell Manufacturing Company, a defunct American motor vehicle company
 Powell Peralta or Powell Corporation, a skateboard company

Other uses
 Powell v. Alabama, a 1932 U.S. Supreme Court case regarding capital punishment and due process
 Powell v. McCormack, a 1969 U.S. Supreme Court case regarding seating of a member of the House of Representatives
 Powell Doctrine, a use of military force doctrine
 Powell's method, an algorithm for finding the minimum of a non-differentiable function

See also

Powel (disambiguation)
Powells (disambiguation)
Baden Powell (disambiguation)